Infobip is a Croatian IT and telecommunications company.  Services include omnichannel communications, contact center, chatbot, customer engagement, and customer data platforms as well as identity and security. Infobip reaches over seven billion mobile devices and ‘things’ in more than 190 countries connected directly to over 700 telecoms networks. Infobip serves both mobile network operators and enterprises, notably banks, social networks and corporations, as well as non-profit organizations and public institutions.

Infobip was founded in Croatia in 2006. Each year Infobip's platform sends more than 350 billion transactions. 

According to Croatian Chamber of Economy, Infobip is one of the world's largest providers of A2P SMS services.

History

Infobip is linked to an entrepreneurial incubator for start-ups, established in the Croatian town of Pula during 2006, whereas the business idea started to grow through the work of a group of friends in the nearby Vodnjan during 2002.

Since 2009, the company has grown internationally, establishing offices and operations in global business hubs. In November 2014, the company announced €1.8 million investment in security, infrastructure, and data protection.

It is a regular exhibitor at mobile, digital and telecommunications events worldwide.

Infobip is a member of GSM Association, trade groups like Mobile Ecosystem Forum, Mobile Marketing Association and Mobey Forum, and holds the PCI DSS certificate, a confirmation of compliance of its messaging system with payment cards industry standards for handling sensitive financial information, like credit card PINs.

In 2014 and 2015, the company saw further consolidation of its operations in Latin America and Asia-Pacific.

Since 2015, the company has been hosting Infobip Dev Days, an annual developers conference for over 300 participants, both its own developers and guest delegates. Conference topics include continuous delivery, distributed systems, principles and methodologies of agile development etc.

In 2020, Infobip raised $200 million in funding from One Equity Partners. Infobip's valuation thus surpassed $1 billion, making it the first Croatian unicorn company. During the same year, Infobip acquired OpenMarket, a company headquartered in Seattle, United States.

In July 2022, Infobip finalized its acquisition of Peerless Network, U.S.-based telecommunications provider founded in 2008.

Infobip is a regular exhibitor at mobile, digital and telecommunications events worldwide. The company is a member of GSM Association, trade groups like Mobile Ecosystem Forum, Mobile Marketing Association and Mobey Forum, and holds the PCI DSS certificate, a confirmation of compliance of its messaging system with payment cards industry standards for handling sensitive financial information, like credit card PINs.

Acquisitions

 Shift Conference, Europe-based tech conference, in April 2021
 US-based Open Market (300 employees) in May 2021
 Anam, SMS firewall developer (77 employees), in May 2021
 Peerless Network, US-based communications provider (230 employees), in July 2022

Research & Development

The company employs over 200 developers, engineers, and programmers divided into 25 development teams in 5 R&D centers, and operates on a principle of continuous deployment, processing over 400 services on 6 globally distributed data centers. The company exposes its REST API allowing developers to add telco-grade functionalities into their IT systems, mobile apps and web services.

Tech Campuses

In 2022, Infobip opened its second campus in Zagreb, called Alpha Centauri, designed by 3LHD architectural firm. The 20,000 square meter Alpha Centauri campus, which was named after the star system closest to Earth, is located near Zagreb’s Sveta Klara and Remetinec neighborhoods.

In September 2017, the company opened its first high-tech campus, named Pangea, built on 17,000 square meters of land in Vodnjan, Croatia. It comprises a central building with offices and conference spaces (5,600 square meters), accommodation units for employees and partners, outdoor sports courts, parking area, and a Mediterranean park.

See also
 Cloud communications
 Text messaging
 GSMA
 SMS
 Telecommunication

References

Mobile telecommunication services
Mobile technology
Software companies of Croatia
Technology companies established in 2006
Croatian brands
Croatian companies established in 2006
Software companies established in 2010
Economy of Pula